Kohei Oda may refer to:

 Kohei Oda (baseball), Japanese baseball catcher
 Kohei Oda (scientist), Japanese microbiologist